Deon Jerome Kayser (born 3 July 1970 in Uitenhage) is a South African former rugby union player and current coach. He played as a wing.

Career
He was called up for the Springboks during the test match at Durban on 19 June 1999 against Italy.

He was also part of the 1999 Rugby World Cup roster, where he took part in 5 matches, and played the 1999 and 2001 Tri Nations.

Until 2004, he played for the Sharks the following season with the Mighty Elephants, at the end of which he retired.
Since 2009, he is technical consultant  - and then coach of the Sharks' youth team.

Test history

See also
List of South Africa national rugby union players – Springbok no. 675
List of South Africa national rugby sevens players

References

External links
Deon Kayser profile SARugby.net

1970 births
Living people
People from Uitenhage
South African rugby union coaches
South African rugby union players
Rugby union wings
South Africa international rugby union players
Rugby sevens players at the 1998 Commonwealth Games
Commonwealth Games competitors for South Africa
Eastern Province Elephants players
Sharks (Currie Cup) players
Sharks (rugby union) players